Clarisse Midroy, called Clarisse Miroy, and also, more simply, Clarisse, (20 April 1820 – 3 September 1870) was a French actress of the 19th century.

Biographie 
She made her debut at the Gymnase-Enfantin and afterward played at the Théâtre de l'Ambigu-Comique. For thirteen years, from 1841 to 1854, she was Frédérick Lemaître's mistress who imposed her in the plays where he acted 
She was the mother of two, Claire and Carole.

Some of her roles 
 Maritana, street singer in Don César de Bazan by Dumanoir and Adolphe d'Ennery, 1844.
 Mina de Rantzberg in Le Caporal et la Payse ou Le vieux Caporal by Dumanoir and Adolphe d'Ennery, 9 May 1853
 La Grâce de Dieu.
 La Bergère des Alpes.
 .
 Gilbert d’Anglars.

References

See also

Bibliography 
 Christine Mateos, Clarisse !!, [S.l.], Maricovi, 2007, .

External links 
 Une comédienne du XIXe

19th-century French actresses
French stage actresses
1820 births
1870 deaths